The third season of the animated sitcom Bob's Burgers began airing on Fox in the United States on September 30, 2012, and concluded on May 12, 2013.

Production
On May 14, 2012, Fox renewed Bob's Burgers for a third production cycle consisting of 13 episodes. On August 23, 2012, six additional scripts were ordered. The third season consisted of the 13 episodes from the second production cycle that did not air during the second season, and also included episodes from the third cycle.

This season featured guest stars such as Thomas Lennon, Jon Hamm, Zach Galifianakis, Jeffrey Tambor, Gary Cole, Bill Hader, and Aziz Ansari.

On May 13, 2014, Amazon.com released the season in a 3-disc-set "Burn-On-Demand" DVD-R.

Episodes

References

External links
 Official website
 
 

2012 American television seasons
2013 American television seasons
Bob's Burgers seasons